Jan Řehoř (born April 30, 1983) is a Czech professional ice hockey forward.

Career 
Řehoř played seventeen regular season games in the Czech Extraliga for HC České Budějovice between 2000 and 2004, scoring one goal. He also played four seasons in France, playing for Red Dogs d'Amnéville, Hockey Club de Reims and Remparts de Tours between 2008 and 2012. He currently plays for Czech fourth-tier side TJ Radomyšl.

Řehoř played in the 2001 IIHF World U18 Championships for the Czech Republic.

References

External links

1983 births
Living people
Czech ice hockey forwards
Diables Noirs de Tours players
Hockey Club de Reims players
Motor České Budějovice players
IHC Písek players
KLH Vajgar Jindřichův Hradec players
Czech expatriate ice hockey people
Expatriate ice hockey players in France
Czech expatriate sportspeople in France